Protein DBF4 homolog A is a protein that is encoded by the DBF4 gene in humans.

Interactions 

DBF4 has been shown to interact with:
 Cell division cycle 7-related protein kinase, 
 MCM3, 
 MCM7, 
 ORC2L,  and
 ORC6L.

References

Further reading 

 
 
 
 
 
 
 
 
 
 
 
 
 

Zinc finger proteins